Neohydatothrips is a genus of thrips in the family Thripidae. There are at least 30 described species in Neohydatothrips.

Species
These species are members of the genus Neohydatothrips:

 Neohydatothrips albus (Jones, 1912)
 Neohydatothrips andrei (J. C. Crawford, 1943)
 Neohydatothrips annulipes (Hood, 1927)
 Neohydatothrips apicalis (Hood, 1927)
 Neohydatothrips baileyi (Hood, 1957)
 Neohydatothrips baptisiae (Hood, 1916)
 Neohydatothrips beachae (Hood, 1927)
 Neohydatothrips catenatus (Hood, 1957)
 Neohydatothrips chrysothamni (Hood, 1936)
 Neohydatothrips collaris (Hood, 1936)
 Neohydatothrips ctenogastris (Hood, 1936)
 Neohydatothrips desertorum (Hood, 1957)
 Neohydatothrips desmodianus (Stannard, 1968)
 Neohydatothrips ephedrae (Hood, 1957)
 Neohydatothrips floridanus (Watson, 1918)
 Neohydatothrips fraxinicola (Hood, 1940)
 Neohydatothrips gracilipes (Hood, 1924)
 Neohydatothrips interruptus (Hood, 1927)
 Neohydatothrips langei (Moulton, 1929)
 Neohydatothrips moultoni (Jones, 1912)
 Neohydatothrips nubilipennis (Hood, 1924)
 Neohydatothrips opuntiae (Hood, 1936)
 Neohydatothrips pedicellatus (Hood, 1927)
 Neohydatothrips portoricensis (Morgan, 1925)
 Neohydatothrips pulchellus (Hood, 1908)
 Neohydatothrips samayunkur (Kudo, 1995)  (marigold thrips)
 Neohydatothrips sambuci (Hood, 1924)
 Neohydatothrips sensilis (Hood, 1936)
 Neohydatothrips setosus (Hood, 1927)
 Neohydatothrips spiritus (Hood, 1927)
 Neohydatothrips tiliae (Hood, 1931)
 Neohydatothrips tissoti (Watson, 1937)
 Neohydatothrips variabilis (Beach, 1896)  (soybean thrips)
 Neohydatothrips vicenarius (Hood, 1955)
 Neohydatothrips zebra (Hood, 1940)

References

 Nickle, David A. (2003). "A checklist of commonly intercepted thrips (Thysanoptera) from Europe, the Mediterranean, and Africa at U. S. ports-of-entry (1983-1999), Part 1: Key to genera". Proceedings of the Entomological Society of Washington, vol. 105, no. 1, 80-99.

Further reading

 Arnett, Ross H. (2000). American Insects: A Handbook of the Insects of America North of Mexico. CRC Press.

External links

 NCBI Taxonomy Browser, Neohydatothrips

Thripidae